The Leipziger Parkeisenbahn (Leipzig park railway) is a  minimum gauge railway in Leipzig, Germany. The line is also known as the Parkeisenbahn Auensee.

The Railway was first opened in 1951 as "Pioniereisenbahn", one of the children's railways in the former Eastern Bloc Countries.

The line of  goes around a lake called Auensee (formed in 1909, from a gravel pit, the material used to build Leipzig Central Station).

See also 
 Fifteen-inch gauge railway

History

The line opened on 5 August 1951, the second children's railway in the DDR. The railway survived the end of the DDR, and continues its original intention, the education and instruction of children.

External links
Official web site of the Leipziger Parkeisenbahn (in German)

Children's railways
Parkeisenbahn
Tourist attractions in Leipzig
15 in gauge railways in Germany